Carwood is an unincorporated community in Carr Township, Clark County, Indiana.

History
It was previously known as Muddyfork or Muddy Fork after the stream that flows through the town. The post office was established as Muddy Fork in 1858. The post office was renamed Carwood in 1902, and it was discontinued in 1933. Carwood was likely named for John Carr, a pioneer settler.

Geography

References

Unincorporated communities in Clark County, Indiana
Unincorporated communities in Indiana
Louisville metropolitan area